The 2014 World Pool Masters, also known as World Pool Masters XXII, was a nine-ball pool tournament that took place in Nottingham, England, between 14–16 November 2014. It was the 22nd edition of the invitational tournament organised by Matchroom Sport. Shane Van Boening won the event, defeating Nikos Ekonomopoulos in the final 8–2.

Defending champion Niels Feijen lost his first round match to Italian Daniele Corrieri.

Event prize money

Tournament bracket

References

External links

2014
World Pool Masters
World Pool Masters
World Pool Masters
Sport in Nottingham
World Pool Masters
2010s in Nottingham